is a passenger railway station in the city of Takasaki, Gunma, Japan, operated by the private railway operator Jōshin Dentetsu.

Lines

Station layout
The station consists of a single side platform serving traffic in both directions. The station is unattended.

Adjacent stations

History

Surrounding area
Takasaki Industrial training school

See also
 List of railway stations in Japan

External links

 Jōshin Dentetsu 
  Burari-Gunma 

Railway stations in Gunma Prefecture
Railway stations in Japan opened in 1930
Takasaki, Gunma